Gomphogyne is a genus of flowering plants belonging to the family Cucurbitaceae.

Its native range is Himalaya to Philippines.

Species:

Gomphogyne bonii 
Gomphogyne cissiformis 
Gomphogyne hainanensis 
Gomphogyne heterosperma 
Gomphogyne longgangensis 
Gomphogyne nepalensis 
Gomphogyne stenocarpa

References

Cucurbitaceae
Cucurbitaceae genera